The 2019 Blancpain GT Sports Club was the fifth and final season of the SRO Motorsports Group's Blancpain GT Sports Club, an auto racing series for grand tourer cars. The Blancpain GT Sports Club is a championship for Bronze level drivers only, with two additional sub-classes based on age, Titanium and Iron, in order to separate the potential of using higher-level drivers who are often in amateur classes based on their age.  The Titanium categorisation for drivers between the age of 50 and 59. The Iron categorisation for drivers over the age of 60 (meaning all drivers who would be FIA Platinum or Gold but are 60 or older). The races were contested with GT3-spec, GTE-spec, GT2-spec and Trophy cars. The season began on 13 April at Monza and ended on 29 September at Barcelona-Catalunya.

Calendar
At the annual press conference during the 2018 24 Hours of Spa on 27 July, the Stéphane Ratel Organisation announced the first draft of the 2019 calendar, in which the Nürburgring initially made an appearance. It was dropped from the schedule and replaced by Misano, when the finalised calendar was announced on 28 March 2019.

Entry list

Race results

Championship standings
Scoring system
Championship points were awarded for the first ten positions in each race. Entries were required to complete 75% of the winning car's race distance in order to be classified and earn points.

Drivers' championships

Overall

Titanium Cup

Iron Cup

See also
2019 Blancpain GT Series

References

External links

Blancpain GT Sports Club
Blancpain GT Sports Club